The following is a list of constituencies (electoral districts) of Egypt.

2012 list (by governorate)

Party list constituencies

Cairo
 First District of Cairo (10 members)
 Second District of Cairo (8 members)
 Third District of Cairo (8 members)
 Fourth District of Cairo (10 members)

Alexandria
 First District of Alexandria (6 members)
 Second District of Alexandria (10 members)

Port Said
 District of Port Said (4 members)

Ismailia
Ismailia (4 members)

Suez
Suez (4 members)

Qalyubiya
 First District of Qalyubiya (4 members)
 Second District of Qalyubiya (8 members)

Sharquiya
 First District of Sharquiya (10 members)
 Second District of Sharquiya (10 members)

Daqahliya
 First District of Daqahliya (8 members)
 Second District of Daqahliya (8 members)
 Third District of Daqahliya (8 members)

Damietta
Damietta (8 members)

Kafr el-Sheikh
 First District of Kafr el-Sheikh (8 members)
 Second District of Kafr el-Sheikh (4 members)

Gharbiya
 First District of Gharbiya (10 members)
 Second District of Gharbiya (10 members)

Monoufiya
 First District of Monoufiya (8 members)
 Second District of Monoufiya (8 members)

Beheira
 First District of Beheira (12 members)
 Second District of Beheira (8 members)

Giza
 First District of Giza (10 members)
 Second District of Giza (10 members)

Faiyoum
 First District of Faiyoum (8 members)
 Second District of Faiyoum (4 members)

Beni Sweif
 First District of Beni Sweif (8 members)
 Second District of Beni Sweif (4 members)

Minya
 First District of Minya (8 members)
 Second District of Minya (8 members)

Assiut
 First District of Assiut (8 members)
 Second District of Assiut (8 members)

Sohag
 First District of Sohag (12 members)
 Second District of Sohag (8 members)

Qena
 First District of Qena (4 members)
 Second District of Qena (8 members)

Luxor
Luxor (4 members)

Aswan
Aswan (4 members)

Matrouh
Matrouh (4 members)

New Valley
New Valley (4 members)

Red Sea
Red Sea (4 members)

South Sinai
South Sinai (4 members)

Single-member constituencies (two members each)

Cairo
 First District of Cairo
 Second District of Cairo
 Third District of Cairo
 Fourth District of Cairo
 Fifth District of Cairo
 sixth District of Cairo
 seventh District of Cairo
 Eighth District of Cairo

External links
 The Supreme Council of the Armed Forces Decree-Law 121/2011 On the Amendment of the Provisions of Law 206/1990 on the specification of the People's Assembly Constituencies

 
Constituencies
Egypt